In set theory,  an ordinal number α is an admissible ordinal if Lα is an admissible set (that is, a transitive model of Kripke–Platek set theory); in other words, α is admissible when α is a limit ordinal and Lα ⊧ Σ0-collection. The term was coined by Richard Platek in 1966.

Any regular uncountable cardinal is an admissible ordinal.

By a theorem of Sacks, the countable admissible ordinals are exactly those constructed in a manner similar to the Church–Kleene ordinal, but for Turing machines with oracles.  One sometimes writes  for the -th ordinal that is either admissible or a limit of admissibles; an ordinal that is both is called recursively inaccessible. There exists a theory of large ordinals in this manner that is highly parallel to that of (small) large cardinals (one can define recursively Mahlo ordinals, for example). But all these ordinals are still countable. Therefore, admissible ordinals seem to be the recursive analogue of regular cardinal numbers.

See also
α-recursion theory
Large countable ordinals
Constructible universe
Regular cardinal

References

Ordinal numbers